Farrukh Dustov (born 22 May 1986) is a retired Uzbek tennis player and tennis coach, playing on the ITF Futures Tour and ATP Challenger Tour. In February 2015, he reached his highest ATP singles ranking of world No. 98.

He was coached by Manuel Gasbarri, Boris Agostini, Petr Lebed and Diego Rosellini.

ATP Challenger and ITF Futures finals

Singles: 22 (10–12)

Doubles: 12 (7–5)

Performance timeline

Singles

References

External links
 
 
 

1986 births
Living people
Asian Games medalists in tennis
Sportspeople from Tashkent
Uzbekistani male tennis players
Tennis players at the 2006 Asian Games
Tennis players at the 2010 Asian Games
Tennis players at the 2014 Asian Games
Tennis players at the 2018 Asian Games
Asian Games bronze medalists for Uzbekistan
Asian Games silver medalists for Uzbekistan
Medalists at the 2010 Asian Games
Medalists at the 2014 Asian Games